Wadi Qana, is a wadi, with an intermittent stream meandering westwards from Huwara, south of Nablus, in the West Bank, Palestine, down to Jaljulia in Israel, from where it flows into the Yarkon River, of which it is a tributary.

Geography and demography
Wadi Qana begins south of Mount Gerizim near the village of Burin in the West Bank. Lined by steep cliffs on either side, the wadi waters flow in a general ENE-WSW direction and reach the Sharon plain near Jaljulia, Israel, where it empties into the Yarkon just west of the Yarkon interchange. West of the central anticline, its surface and sub-aquifers form one of the recharging feeders of the Yarqon Tanninim basin,  of which lie east of the Green Line. Harsh rocky limestone and karst terrain is characteristic of the terrain north of its border towards Kafr Thulth.

As of 2018, the population of the area of the wadi in the West Bank has been estimated at 176,580 Palestinians in 56 communities and 58,195 Israelis in 15 settlements.

Gallery

Prehistoric remains

Dolmens
In 1922, the French biblical scholar and geographer Félix-Marie Abel identified stone structures in Wadi Qana, some consisting of piles seven courses high, as megaliths forming a dolmen necropolis. Dolmens in the region, if the wider definition of the term is accepted, cover the period between the mid-4th millennium to the late-4th millennium BCE i.e. the end of the Late Chalcolithic, and the Early Bronze Age in its entirety, including what some call the Intermediate Bronze Age (see List of archaeological periods).

Wadi Qana cave
By the fourth millennium, human use of the wadi is attested by prehistorical artifacts found in a karstic cave 25 km east of the Mediterranean on the western fringe of the Samaria hills. The existence of the cave came to the attention of speleologists from the Israel Cave Research Center (ICRC) of the Society for the Protection of Nature in Israel when some villagers from Kafr Laqif told them of a deep cave in the wadi, which they then located, 250 metres up from the wadi floor, after a two-day search the following year. It contained a cemetery. Placing mortuary sites at a distance from settlements is a characteristic innovation of the Levantine Chalcolithic period, and this one could be accessed only by crawling through a 15 metre long tunnel, which then opened up into a 500 square metre subterranean hall.

Over several years, a team of Israeli archaeologists led by Avi Gopher excavated the site. Three strata were brought to light, indicating it had undergone successive occupation from the 6th millennium BCE, beginning with the Yarmukian culture, through to the Chalcolithic, down to the early Bronze Age1.

Chalcolithic gold, earliest in the Levant
The Chalcolithic remains were particularly rich, with a cemetery yielding up, aside from ossuaries, pithoi, churns and varieties of creamware, 8 ring-shaped objects, mostly cast from electrum, with a 70% gold and 30% silver content. The archaeologists opined that the most probable source for the gold ingots was Egypt, where ring-shaped metallic valuables are attested from pictograms of imperial trade. Those in the Wadi Qana cave are the first known examples from the Levant. A further significant feature from the find was that the person buried with such objects, the latter suggestive of status symbols, probably had high rank, which would mean that social development in the area in that period was more advanced than hitherto thought.

Biblical narrative
According to the biblical narrative of the allotment of territories, following Joshua's conquest of Canaan, Wadi Qana (naḥal qānāh, 'the brook Kanah' of   served as the boundary running between the northern Manasseh and the southern Ephraim.  The description of the border is somewhat complicated, since they overlap with the former Amorite Tappuah being Ephraimite but in Manasseh territory.

Modern era

Population: tradition and facts
A tradition among the population of the Wadi Qana ecosystem in the area to the north of the gully itself – an area which has a scant 139 hectares of arable land – holds that their ancestors once occupied Zakur (itself now abandoned). It has been suggested that this dispersion may have had its roots in a strong blood feud, and that the people of Zakur moved first to Kafr Thulth and, finding no good land available there, then spread out to dwell in five hamlets adjacent to Wadi Qana. The dominant group at Kafr Thulth itself, those with the best pastures, are the Gharaba family, who also own the best land in Wadi Qana's tributaries. Down to the mid-1980s, 50 families lived in the wadi itself, in a hamlet with rock structures adjacent to the stream, and known as Wadi Qana.

British Mandate, Jordan, and Israel/PA

British nature reserve
In 1926, the mandate government declared a nature reserve comprising 30,000 dunums of natural forest within the village boundaries of Deir Istiya in Wady Kanah. In 1943, this reserve was abolished and instead four forest reserves, Wad Qana and Wad Qana South, East and West, totalling about 12,000 dunums in the village lands of Deir Istiya, Jinsafur and Kafr Laqif were declared.

Arab settlement and agriculture
The West Bank part of Wadi Qana, surrounded by Palestinian villages such as Deir Istiya, Qarawat Bani Hassan, Biddya, Sanniriya, Kafr Thulth, Azzun, Kafr Laqif and Jinsafut, runs through a fertile valley and constituted one of the most notable natural attractions in terms of the beauty of its landscape, given its abundance of springs, extent of its well-watered land, and plentiful trees. The area has traditionally furnished local Palestinians with important land for grazing livestock, harvesting agricultural products, especially citrus, and for leisure (bathing). Many families also used it to dwell along the wadi's reaches. Its water was drawn in order to irrigate vegetable plots. It afforded rich grazing for flocks, carrying an estimated 50,000 sheep down to the early 1980s, compared to the 3,000 Palestinians still manage to tend in the wadi in recent years (2017). The wadi runs between the Palestinian administrative zones of the Salfit and Qalqilya Governorates.

It is estimated that approximately 200 local farmers worked in their fields inside the Wadi Qana valley down to 1967. In that year the area came under Israeli occupation in the wake of the Six-Day War. In the succeeding 33 years, the number of farmers shrunk to 14.

Israeli settlement; land and water use
In the 1970s Israel began deep drilling in the wadi area with its rich groundwater resources and one consequence was that many springs and wells used by local Palestinians dried up. In 1978 it began to establish Israeli settlements on the high banks on either side of the wadi. According to B'Tselem, Karnei Shomron was set up in that year on lands confiscated from four Palestinian villages: Jinsafut, Deir Istiya, Kafr Laqif and Hajjah, while Immanuel was established in 1983 taking 951 dunams from Deir Istiya, and, in establishing Sha'ar Emmanuel (1981) 159 dunams were confiscated from Immatain. To the south, both Yaqir (1981) and Nofim were established on territory was appropriated from Deir Istiya. After the Oslo Accords (1993 and 1995) and the establishment of the Palestinian National Authority (PA), the central sector of the wadi, east of Qalqiliya, became part of Area C, and was mostly owned by the villagers of Deir Istiya. Later, further illegal outposts such as Alonei Shilo (1999), Yair Farm (1999) and El Matan (2000) were set up in the wadi zone. All of these settlements discharged their sewage waste waters into the Wadi Qana stream, contaminating its use for Palestinian irrigation, until the recognized settlements were connected to the sewage system in 2006. The illegal Israeli outposts of Alonei Shilo and El Matan however continue to pollute the stream by discharging their wastewater directly into it. Palestinian villages nearby add to this pollution by using cesspits whose contents are then randomly discharged into open areas and valleys near the wadi's springs. In 1995 it was estimated that Yaqir, Karnei Shomron, and Immanuel alone annually generated approximately 908,700 cubic meters of wastewater directly into the Wadi. This combination of polluting discharges from settlements, and the reduced water flow caused by Israeli drilling undermined the traditional exploitation of its waters for irrigating vegetable crops, and forced some 50 families resident in the wadi to shift out, moving to Deir Istiya. The plan of Israel's "Separation Barrier" cuts out Deir Istiya from the wadi, leaving it on the 'Israeli' side of that sector of the West Bank. When the Kana Stream Restoration Authority (2006) was inaugurated, one of its purposes, according to leaders of the settlement councils, was to block what they regarded as attempts by 'Palestinian elements' to assume control of the wadi's stream. Since 2005 an annual spring walk takes place under the auspices of the Karnei Shomron Council. During the walk, local Palestinians, including landowners, are not permitted to access the wadi. Further projects, with large investments from the Israeli government and the Jewish National Fund, aim at developing it as a major Israeli tourist site. That part of the wadi's village lands lying in Area C may not, under the Israeli dispensation, be used for Palestinian commercial or industrial projects: The one remaining option of using it for agricultural purposes – planting olive trees, for example, is, however, hampered by severe restrictions imposed by the Israeli authorities on the grounds that such activities damage the wadi's natural flora, the topography, and the character of the habitat.' On 23 May 2021, around 15 settlers, escorted by some 5 Israeli soldiers, herded about 60 cattle into the area to graze them there. When Wadi Qana's farmers who own fields and groves there protested, they were pepper-sprayed and clubbed by settlers and one was rifle-butted by a soldier. Those not injured were prevented from leaving the valley until late at night. On returning to their homes, they found 4 of their cars damaged.

Israeli nature reserve; conflict

The Israeli military order (IMO) regarding Nature Protection (Judea and Samaria) (No. 363), 5730 – 1969, governs use of areas designated as nature reserves, based on similar Israeli laws. According to Friends of the Earth International, from 1979 to 1982 the area was declared a closed military zone. On 3 May 1983 it was declared a nature reserve in accordance with the IMO. The nature reserve was established on the agricultural lands of the Palestinian village of Deir Istiya. The area around the West Bank area of Wadi Qana is a nature reserve operated by the Israel Nature and Parks Authority (INPA) A hundred Jewish homes have been built inside the park. Alonei Shilo was built as an Israeli outpost within the reserve and then subsequently gained Israeli authorization by reclassifying it as part of the Karnei Shomron settlement. Land from the reserve was also allocated to the El Matan outpost. Amira Hass cites the Wadi Qana reserve as an example of Israeli efforts to "narrow the Palestinian expanse" by creating nature reserves and that the goal of the reserves is "to dispossess Palestinians".

In 2011 the Israeli National Parks Authority uprooted 1,000 olive trees planted by Wadi Palestinians and issued a directive for the grubbing up of a further 1,400. The reason given was ecological. On appeal, the Supreme Court of Israel handed down a judgement that the directive could apply only to saplings younger than 3 years. The following year Israeli park wardens nonetheless marked for destruction 2,100 olive trees, many of them older than the 3 year limit. On 23 January 2014, rangers with bulldozers under military escort ripped out between 500 and 800 olive trees which were then transported to an unknown location. Tear canisters were fired at the Palestinians protesting the measure. In August of that year, settlers constructed a new road, using bulldozers, through the wadi, without any permit. The master plan envisages a ring road connecting all the outposts and settlements, while blocking the one existing access road Palestinians may use.

According to the United Nations Office for the Coordination of Humanitarian Affairs, Israel has destroyed Palestinian irrigation channels in the Wadi Qana area "under the pretext of environmental protection". B'Tselem reported that while the wadi area was actively being developed into a tourist site, Israeli authorities were issuing orders prohibiting any Palestinian development of the land. Friends of the Earth International reported that Palestinian agricultural projects have been destroyed by the Israeli authorities "under the guise of nature protection", calling the creation of such nature reserves "a significant tool of ethnic cleansing for the Israeli occupying forces." Outposts are often built or build inside nature reserves and in the past the INPA has done little about it even working hand in hand with the settlers. In a recent departure from this practice, the INPA, in 2018, initiated proceedings against 3 settlers from Alonei Shiloh for constructing a road partly passing through the reserve.

Notes

Citations

Bibliography

External links 
 Survey of Western Palestine, Map 14: IAA, Wikimedia commons

Rivers of Israel
Rivers of the State of Palestine